The Edward M. Kennedy Academy for Health Careers (formerly Health Careers Academy) is one of several Horace Mann Charter Schools in the Boston Public Schools system.  On April 25, 2010, the school was renamed to honor the late senator, Edward M. Kennedy.

Located in Boston, Massachusetts, United States on the campus of Northeastern University, EMK is a college prep high school with a focus on careers in the health professions. Among its partners is the Center for Community Health Education Research and Service (CCHERS), which noted a need in the community for a more diverse population of health care providers.

Awards and honors
 In 2008 Ranked as one of US World and News Reports top schools.
 In 2006 recognized as one of the top 10 Boston Area High Schools according to the Boston Globe.
 In 2007 recognized for being one of 3 schools in the Commonwealth of Massachusetts to graduate 100% of its students of the class of 2006.
 In 2003 renewed as a Horace Mann Charter School by the Massachusetts Department of Education.

Demographics
The demographic at HCA indicates that the students come from several diverse areas of Boston.
 Dorchester (40%)
 Mattapan (16%)
 Roxbury (15%)
 Hyde Park (9%)
 Roslindale (6%)
 Other (14%)

The demographics at the school also indicate a racially diverse student body.
 African-American (70%)
 Hispanic (21%)
 White (4%)
 Asian (4%)
 Native American (1%)

Approximately 61% of the student body is on a reduced school lunch program. The school's special education population is at 12%. Average daily attendance at the school is 94%.

See also
 List of school districts in Massachusetts

Notes

External links
 
 CCHERS
 Boston Public Schools
 Massachusetts Charter Schools
  Massachusetts Department of Education

High schools in Boston
Charter schools in Massachusetts
Public high schools in Massachusetts
Educational institutions established in 1998
1998 establishments in Massachusetts